The Asia-Pacific Scout Region of the World Organization of the Scout Movement has run or sponsored region-wide Asia-Pacific Scout Jamborees in its member countries, originally known as Pan-Pacific Jamborees.

List of Asia-Pacific Scout Jamborees

References

Scouting jamborees